Dybowskites is an extinct genus of bryozoan of the family Ralfimartitidae, found in the Ordovician and Silurian periods. It forms branching, frond-like, or sometimes segmented colonies. In cross-sections of the colonies, the tubular autozooecia are seen growing alongside the branch axis and then bending abruptly to reach the colony surface at a perpendicular angle. There are many mesozooecia and large acanthostyles that protrude from the colony surface.

Species
Two species are recognized:

References

Prehistoric bryozoan genera
Trepostomata